State Route 185 (SR 185) is an east to west secondary highway in Gibson County, Tennessee that is 7.67 miles (12.3 km) long.  Its western terminus is in Dyer at the junction with US 45W.  Its eastern terminus is just outside Bradford at SR 54.  East of Dyer the highway is also called Poplar Grove Road.

Route description

SR 185 begins just west of downtown Dyer at an interchange with US 45W/SR 5/SR 77. It goes east as Yorkville Street to enter downtown, where it turns south as Main Street (Old US 45W). It passes through downtown before turning east onto Poplar Grove Road, where it leaves Dyer and continues east through farmland before coming to an end at an intersection with SR 54.

History

The original western terminus was in Dyer at the intersection of Main Street (then US 45W) and Poplar Grove Road. In 2001, when US 45W was realigned to a newly constructed bypass route to the west of Dyer, SR 185 was extended through Dyer on Main Street and Yorkville Street (formerly SR 77) to the new US 45W. This change went unsigned until May 2008.

Major intersections

See also
List of Tennessee state highways

References

Tennessee Department of Transportation (24 January 2003). "State Highway and Interstate List 2003".

External links
Tennessee Department of Transportation

185
Transportation in Gibson County, Tennessee